Offaly County Council is the authority responsible for local government in County Offaly, Ireland. As a county council, it is governed by the Local Government Act 2001. The council is responsible for housing and community, roads and transportation, urban planning and development, amenity and culture, and environment. The council has 19 elected members. Elections are held every five years and are by single transferable vote. The head of the council has the title of Cathaoirleach (Chairperson). The county administration is headed by a Chief Executive, Anna Marie Delaney. The county town is Tullamore.

History
Originally Tullamore Courthouse had been the meeting place of Offaly County Council. The county council moved to modern facilities at County Hall in 2002.

Local Electoral Areas and Municipal Districts
Offaly County Council is divided into the following municipal districts and local electoral areas, defined by electoral divisions.

Councillors

2019 seats summary

Councillors by electoral area
This list reflects the order in which councillors were elected on 24 May 2019.

Notes

Co-options

Changes in affiliation

References

External links

Politics of County Offaly
County councils in the Republic of Ireland